Hermes Manuel Palomino Fariñes (born 4 March 1988 in Caracas) is a Venezuelan footballer who currently plays as a forward.

Club career

In Venezuela
Palomino started playing as a professional at the age of eighteen with Trujillanos. The following year, he joined Carabobo but, after one season playing with the team, was bought by Guaros de Lara.

Palomino played also for two other Venezuelan clubs, Minervén and Aragua, until 2011, when he joined Bulgarian A PFG side Cherno More Varna.

Cherno More
On 1 July 2011 Palomino scored on his debut in a pre-season friendly against Dacia Chişinău, netting the second in a 2–2 draw. He made his league debut for Cherno More in a 2–0 win over Montana on 6 August. Week later, Palomino scored his first goal in the Bulgarian A PFG in their 3–1 home win against Levski Sofia. On 27 August he assisted Ilian Kapitanov for the second goal in a 2–0 home victory over Minyor Pernik. On 18 October, in a 5–0 away victory over Kaliakra Kavarna, he assisted Georgi Iliev for the first goal in the match and scored Cherno More's third. On 28 November, in a 1–1 away draw against Slavia Sofia, Palomino netted his third goal of the season.

During the winter break, he was close to being transferred to Zorya Luhansk, but the deal eventually fell through. He missed the last games of the 2011–12 A PFG season due to sustaining an injury. Palomino was mostly confined to substitute appearances following Georgi Ivanov's appointment as head coach.

Atlético Venezuela
On 25 May 2013, Palomino signed with Atlético Venezuela on a two-year deal.

FC Sevlievo
In January 2019, he signed for FC Sevlievo in Bulgaria after two seasons in Finland for PEPO.

Lovćen
In February 2020, Palomino moved to Montenegro to join FK Lovćen.

International career
In December 2011, Palomino received his first call-up to the national team for a friendly game against Costa Rica. On 22 December, he made his debut, coming on as a second-half substitute for Louis Angelo Peña in the match that was lost by a score of 0–2.

References

External links
 

1988 births
Living people
People from Caracas
Venezuelan footballers
Association football forwards
Trujillanos FC players
Carabobo F.C. players
Asociación Civil Deportivo Lara players
Minervén S.C. players
Aragua FC players
PFC Cherno More Varna players
Atlético Venezuela C.F. players
Deportivo Miranda F.C. players
Managua F.C. players
Lija Athletic F.C. players
FK Lovćen players
First Professional Football League (Bulgaria) players
Venezuelan Primera División players
Kakkonen players
Venezuelan expatriate footballers
Venezuelan expatriate sportspeople in Bulgaria
Venezuelan expatriate sportspeople in Nicaragua
Venezuelan expatriate sportspeople in the Dominican Republic
Expatriate footballers in Bulgaria
Expatriate footballers in Nicaragua
Expatriate footballers in Finland
Expatriate footballers in Indonesia
Expatriate footballers in the Dominican Republic
Expatriate footballers in Malta
Expatriate footballers in Montenegro
Venezuela international footballers